Love Classics is a compilation album by Japanese entertainer Ayumi Hamasaki. It was released on January 28, 2015, by Avex Trax.

Background
This was Hamasaki's first for 2015, and dubbed as a "mash-up album" between Hamasaki's love songs and classical music, it was composed of previously-released ballad love songs, which were rearranged using classical pieces from renowned European compositors, such as Antonio Vivaldi, Johann Sebastian Bach, Frédéric Chopin, and Claude Debussy, among others. The album was commercially prepared to be a Valentine's Day present. The album cover, created by visual artist Aki Miyajima, is based on one of the covers of Hamasaki's single "Zutto.../Last Minute/Walk" released in December 2014.

Track listing

Chart performance
The album debuted at number 16 on the Oricon charts, with 6,192 copies sold,  considerably lower in comparison to Hamasaki's previous classical album, A Classical, released in January 2013, which peaked at number 1 with first-week sales of 25,049 copies. Love Classics  subsequently charted for 4 weeks, selling 8,272 copies in total.

References

2015 albums
Ayumi Hamasaki albums